The 63rd Session of the Utah State Legislature took place from 2019 to 2020 with a total of eight sessions, two constitutionally mandated general sessions (one each year) and six special sessions. While it's typical that the legislature has at least one special session per year, the high number of sessions was the result of the COVID-19 pandemic.

Composition of the House of Representatives

Leadership in the People's House

Members of the 63rd House of Representatives

↑Representative was originally appointed into office.

Composition of the Senate

Leadership of the Senate

Members of the 63rd Senate

↑: Senator was originally appointed

See also
Utah State Legislative districts
Utah State House of Representatives
Utah State Senate
List of Utah State Legislatures
Elections in Utah
Utah Republican Party
Utah Democratic Party

Notes

References

External links
Utah House of Representatives
Utah Republican Party
Utah Democratic Party
Map of Utah House of Representative districts

State lower houses in the United States
Utah legislative sessions
2019 in Utah
2020 in Utah
2019 U.S. legislative sessions
2020 U.S. legislative sessions